Jod may refer to:
Jod, alternate name for the deity Velns in Latvian mythology
Jod, alternate spelling of jor (music), an aspect of Indian music
Jod, alternate spelling of Yodh, a letter of the Semitic alphabet
JOD, ISO 4217 code for the Jordanian dinar 
JOD, acronym for John O'Donnell Stadium (now Modern Woodmen Park) in Davenport, Iowa
JOD, acronym for the SEGA game Nights: Journey of Dreams 
Jód, the Hungarian name for Ieud Commune, Maramureș County, Romania
Jod, alternate name for the Jack of Diamonds card game
Jod, Iran, a village in Sistan and Baluchestan Province, Iran